Sparidentex is a genus of fish in the family Sparidae.

Species
There are currently 4 recognized of this genus:
 Sparidentex belayewi Hora & Misra, 1943 
 Sparidentex datnia F. Hamilton, 1822 
 Sparidentex jamalensis S. A. Amir, Siddiqui & Masroor, 2014 (Fanged seabream) 
 Sparidentex hasta Valenciennes, 1830 (Sobaity seabream)

References

Sparidae
Marine fish genera